Cristian Ghinea (born 1977) is a Romanian publisher and activist who has been serving as a Minister of Investments and European Projects in the cabinet of Prime Minister Florin Cîțu since 2021.

Political career 
Before entering politics, Ghinea was founder and director of organization CRPE. In November 2015 he was appointed councillor for European business in the Cioloș Cabinet.

Ghinea was elected to the Chamber of Deputies in the 2016 Romanian legislative election. From 27 April to 26 October 2016 he served as Minister of European Funds in the Romanian government of technocrats, under Prime Minister Dacian Cioloș. Since October 2017, has been the vice president of the party Save Romania Union.

From 2019 until 2020, Ghinea was a Member of the European Parliament. In parliament, he served on the Committee on Regional Development.

References
<ref>

External links
  (in Romanian)
 Cristian Ghinea: Sunt adeptul unor poziții de forță. Asistăm la întărirea fără precedent a statului, interview by Andreea Pora, Revista 22 -  12 July 2016
 Cristian Ghinea: Dacă PNL și USR vor putea să convingă populația și programul acestui Guvern poate fi prelungit, eu m-aș bucura foarte mult, interview by Raluca Ion, Republica.ro - 22 August 2016

1977 births
Living people
Members of the Romanian Cabinet
Members of the Chamber of Deputies (Romania)
Save Romania Union MEPs
Save Romania Union politicians
MEPs for Romania 2019–2024